The TOM'S 84C was a Group C sports prototype race car, designed, developed and built by TOM'S, in partnership and collaboration with Toyota, for the World Sportscar Championship, All Japan Sports Prototype Championship, and the 24 Hours of Le Mans, in 1984.

References

Group C cars
84C